MF & DAZN: X Series 004 features KSI vs FaZe Temperrr, billed as Uncaged, which was an exhibition crossover boxing match contested between British YouTuber KSI and Brazilian YouTuber FaZe Temperrr. The bout took place at the Wembley Arena, London, England on 14 January 2023. The fight sold 300,000 PPV buys.

Background 
After defeating Luis Alcaraz Pineda, KSI announced that he will return to the ring in January 2023 and called out Slim Albaher, winner of the Austin McBroom vs. AnEsonGib bout, Andrew Tate, and Tommy Fury. On 19 November, it was announced that KSI vs Dillon Danis was set for 14 January at Wembley Arena, London, England.

However, on 4 January, Danis withdrew from the bout due to lack of preparation and coaching, as well as issues with the contracted weight. That same day it was announced that FaZe Temperrr will be KSI's opponent. Temperrr was originally on the undercard with a mystery opponent that would be announced on fight night.

Face off 
The virtual Face Off between KSI and Danis was hosted by Kai Cenat on his personal Twitch page on 3 December. Within the Face Off, KSI revealed to Cenat that his next opponent following Danis could be either Tyron Woodley or Joe Fournier. KSI also stated that the bout between him and Jake Paul is slated for the end of 2023 and that the contract is underway.

Press conferences 
The launch press conference was held at the on 15 December. Danis was not present during the conference as he was cited as "suffering a bout of influenza" and when requested to join via a Zoom call, he refused. Danis later tweeted "the king does what he wants".

The final press conference was held at Boxpark on 12 January and open to the public.

Card 
KSI vs. FaZe Temperrr headlined the event, while Slim Albaher vs. Tom Zanetti served as the co-main event. The undercard consisted of Salt Papi vs. Josh Brueckner, Luis Alcaraz Pineda vs. BDave, Ryan Taylor vs. Swarmz, Faith Ordway vs. Elle Brooke, and Anthony Taylor vs. Idris Virgo.

Fight card

Broadcasting

MF & DAZN: X Series 005 
During the broadcast, it was announced that Jay Swingler vs NichLmao would take place on 25 February 2023 in Milton Keynes, England. It was later announced that the event had been postponed to 4 March in Telford, England due to clashes with Jake Paul vs Tommy Fury on the same date.

Notes

References

External links 

2023 in boxing
2023 in Internet culture
Boxing in England
Boxing matches
Crossover boxing events
DAZN
FaZe Clan
KSI
Pay-per-view boxing matches
YouTube
YouTube Boxing events
2023 sports events in London
January 2023 sports events in the United Kingdom